Cantwell or Cantwells may refer to:

Places
 Cantwell, Alaska, a US census-designated place
 Cantwell, West Virginia
 Cantwell's Court, a townland in County Kilkenny, Ireland
 Cantwells Run, a stream in Ohio

Other uses
 Cantwell (surname), people with the surname Cantwell
 Cantwell Fada (also known as the Long Man), an effigy of a knight on display in the ruins of a 14th-century church in Kilfane, near Thomastown in County Kilkenny, Ireland
 Cantwell v. Connecticut, a US Supreme Court case